Mark Beyer (born October 8, 1950) is a self-taught American artist and former cartoonist. His comics were known for their bleak story lines, often featuring death, disfigurement, depression, and humiliation, which contrasted with his self-taught, geometric drawing style. Most of his stories were about the adventures of a codependent yet resentful couple named Amy and Jordan. Beyer made one final comic strip for the summer 2012 issue of the British magazine ArtReview.

Biography
Beyer is originally from Allentown, Pennsylvania in the Lehigh Valley region of eastern Pennsylvania. He is a self-taught, outsider artist whose work has appeared in Raw Vision magazine.

Beyer's work was prominently featured in all but two issues (#3 and 4) of Raw magazine.   He has also been published in New York Press and New Musical Express. Beyer also had a recurring animated short series on MTV's Liquid Television (The Adventures of Thomas and Nardo); and a 1995 movie by Gregg Araki, The Doom Generation, was loosely based on the Amy and Jordan strips.

He has also produced cover artwork, including Xman and *** by Michael Brodsky, T-shirts and posters for John Zorn and the New York Downtown avant-garde music scene. In particular the cover and inserts for Zorn's tribute to Ornette Coleman Spy vs Spy (1989) and a popular Naked City T-shirt.

Although he mostly works solo, Beyer has collaborated with writer Alan Moore.

Books
A Disturbing Evening and Other Stories. Allentown, PA: Mark Beyer, 1978. .
Manhattan. New York: Raw Books, 1978.
Dead Stories. Allentown, PA: Mark Beyer, 1982. .
Dead Stories. Sudbury, MA: Water Row Press, 2000. .
Agony. New York: Raw Books, 1987. .
Agony. New York: New York Review, 2016. .
Agony. Augsburg: MaroVerlag, 1992. German translation.
Amy + Jordan. Paris: Sketch Studio, 1993.
Amy + Jordan. Augsburg: MaroVerlag, 1996.
We're Depressed. Sudbury, MA: Water Row Press, 1999. .
Amy and Jordan. New York: Pantheon, 2004. .
Amy and Jordan. Paris: Camboukaris, 2013. .

Zines
This list may not be complete.
Mark Beyer. Death. PA: Mark Beyer, 1980.
Mark Beyer. Amy and Jordan at Beach lake. PA: Mark Beyer, 1983.
Mark Beyer and Emilia Brintnall. Pain Parade. Edition of 250.
Mark Beyer. Pooooo. Liancourt: CBO Éditions, 1996. Edition of 150. 
Mark Beyer. Lost Faces. Zürich, 2000. Edition of 350.
Gary Panter and Mark Beyer. Panter versus Beyer. Liancourt: CBO Éditions, 2003. Edition of 100. . 
Mark Beyer. Ne'er-do-wellers. Trapset Zines, 2017. Edition of 200.
Mark Beyer. 2016–17. Marseille: Le Dernier Cri, 2017. Edition of 500.

Notes

External links
Raw Vision, "Mark Beyer Letting out the Id", Les Coleman, Issue 78, 2013
Escape from the Pondox Corporation: Mark Beyer and the Mystery of the Mundane, 2018
Billy Ireland Cartoon Library & Museum Art Database

1950 births
Living people
20th-century American artists
Album-cover and concert-poster artists
Alternative cartoonists
American comics artists
Artists from Allentown, Pennsylvania
Raw (magazine)